Mach 7 or variation, may refer to:

 Mach number for seven times the speed of sound
 Hypersonic speed of 7 times the speed of sound
 Mach-VII (Marvel Comics), comic book superhero alter-ego of Marvel Comics character Abner Jenkins
 Wharfedale MACH 7, a loudspeaker in the Wharfedale series MACH

See also

Mach (disambiguation)